Sysoev or Sysoyev is a Russian surname. It was derived from the male given name Sysoy and literally means Sysoy's. It may refer to:
 Aleksey Sysoyev (born 1985), a Russian decathlete
 Daniel Sysoev (1974–2009), a Russian Orthodox priest, the rector of St. Thomas' church in southern Moscow and a prominent missionary
 Igor Sysoev (born 1970), software developer
 Igor Sysoyev (born 1980), Russian triathlete
 Valentin Sysoyev (disambiguation)
 Gleb Sysoev, Russian black metal musician (Ultar)

Russian-language surnames